Leith Anderson (born 1944) is president emeritus of the National Association of Evangelicals and Baptist pastor emeritus of Wooddale Church in Eden Prairie, Minnesota, after serving as senior pastor from 1977 through 2011.

Early life and education 
Leith Anderson is the son of Charles William Anderson and Margery Freeman Anderson. His father was pastor of Brookdale Baptist Church in Bloomfield, NJ (1939-1972) and was the founder/president of Northeastern Bible College in Essex Fells, NJ (later merged with The Kings College in New York City). His mother was born and raised in England and migrated to the United States as an adult.

Leith Anderson graduated from West Essex High School, North Caldwell, New Jersey; Moody Bible Institute, Chicago, Illinois (diploma); Bradley University, Peoria, Illinois (B.A. in Sociology); Denver Seminary, Denver, Colorado (Master of Divinity); and Fuller Theological Seminary, Pasadena, California (Doctor of Ministry).

Anderson took additional course work at Northwestern University, Chicago, Illinois; The Iliff School of Theology, Denver, Colorado; and the University of Colorado, Boulder, Colorado.

Ministry 
Leith Anderson's introduction to writing began as editor of the student newspaper at the Moody Bible Institute and through journalism classes at Northwestern University.

During his seminary studies he served part-time as a youth pastor at Calvary Church (Longmont, Colorado) and became the senior pastor of the church upon graduation for a total of 10 years in pastoral ministry at the church. While pastoring he continued academic studies at the University of Colorado and Fuller Theological Seminary and became an adjunct professor of pastoral theology and homiletics at Denver Seminary.

In 1977 Anderson began his 35 years as senior pastor of Wooddale Church in suburban Minneapolis. The church was located in Richfield, Minnesota, until 1984 when it moved to a new building on a 33-acre campus in Eden Prairie, Minnesota, and grew to become a congregation of thousands, one of the larger churches in the state and region. While pastoring he also wrote books and articles on church and biblical themes, taught in numerous seminary doctoral programs (including Bethel University, Trinity Evangelical Divinity School, Fuller Theological Seminary, Northeastern Seminary and others).

In addition Anderson became a frequent speaker at national and international conferences and served on the boards of Bethel University, Navigators, National Association of Evangelicals, World Vision, World Relief and other nonprofit organizations. In 2019 he was named to the Founder's Chair of World Vision International.

Anderson continued as the pastor of Wooddale Church when he became the interim president of the National Association of Evangelicals as the NAE faced organizational stress in 2001 and continued until 2003. When the NAE had a leadership vacuum in 2006, Anderson returned as interim president and then became the elected president for terms in 2007 extending through 2019 when he announced his retirement from the position at the end of that term.

At the end of 2011, he retired as pastor of the church and continued as president of the NAE in Washington, D.C., while maintaining his home in Minnesota. During his presidency, the NAE stabilized and grew with expanded membership and many new staff and programs including NAE Talk (conferences addressing contemporary social and theological issues), Evangelical Leaders Survey (monthly survey of national leaders on a broad array of topics with published reports, Evangelicals magazine, Today's Conversation podcast, annual retreat of denomination leaders, and publications titled "Theology of Sex," "For the Health of the Nation" and others.

As NAE president, Anderson frequently participated in amicus curiae briefs, news conferences and interviews, and connected religious and other leaders across the United States and internationally. Priority was given to issues of religious freedom, immigration policies, evangelical biblical theology and values, social justice and engaging evangelicals in evangelism, humanitarian services and cultural influence. 

In 2012, President Barack Obama named Leith Anderson to the White House Advisory Council on Faith-Based and Neighborhood Partnerships. Anderson was elected to the Founder's Chair of World Vision International in 2019.

He has been published in many periodicals and has written over 20 books (including translations into foreign languages).

Personal life 
Anderson grew up in the same church as Charleen Lillian Alles whom he started dating the month he turned 15 and married in 1965. They are the parents of four children.

Recognition
He received honorary doctorates from Cornerstone University, Grand Rapids, Michigan (Doctor of Divinity); Moody Bible Institute, Chicago, Illinois (Doctor of Divinity); and Eastern University, St. Davids, Pennsylvania (Doctor of Humane Letters).

Bibliography
Making Happiness Happen (1987)
Mastering Church Management (1991)
A Church for the 21st Century (1992)
Who's in Charge: Mastering Ministry (1993)
The Best Is Yet To Come (1994)
Winning the Values War in a Changing Culture: Thirteen Distinct Values That Mark a Follower of Jesus Christ (1994)
When God Says No (1996)
Dying for Change (1998)
Praying to the God You Can Trust (1998)
Leadership That Works: Hope and Direction for Church and Parachurch Leaders in Today's Complex World (2001)
Becoming Friends With God: A Devotional Invitation to Intimacy With God (2001)
Jesus: An Intimate Portrait of the Man, His Land, and His People (2006)
Igniting Worship Series – 40 Days with Jesus: Worship Services and Video Clips on DVD (2006)
How to Act Like a Christian (2006)
The Jesus Revolution: Learning from Christ's First Followers (2009)
Faith Matters (2011)
The Volunteer Church (2015)
Faith in the Voting Booth (2016)

Chapters & contributions 

Married to a Pastor's Wife, H.B. London and Neil Wiseman, editors (1993)
Leadership Handbooks, Jim Berkley, editor (1994)
Library of Christian Leadership: Empowering Your Church Through Creativity and Changes, Marshall Shelley, editor (1995)
Leading People, Robert H. Rosen, editor (1996)
Library of Leadership Development: Renewing Your Church Through Vision and Planning, Marshall Shelley, editor (1997)
Library of Leadership Development: Growing Your Church Through Training and Motivation, Marshall Shelley, editor (1997)
Raising Teens While They're Still in Preschool (excerpts), Ron Habermas, author (1998)
Uncommon Graces (forward), John Vawter, author (1998)
 Vital Church Issues, Roy B. Zuck, editor (Bibliotheca Sacra,1998)
 Global Crossroads, W. Harold Fuller, editor (1998)
 Leadership And Power, Richard Leslie Parrot, editor (2003)
 Giving Ourselves To Prayer, Dan. R. Crawford, compiler (2008)
 Welcoming The Stranger (foreword), Matthew Soerens and Jenny Yang, authors (2009, 2019)
 The Shriver Report, Olivia Morgan and Karen Skelton, editors (2014)
 Religious Freedom, LGBT Rights And Prospects For Common Ground, William H. Eskridge and Robin Fretwell Wilson, editors (2019)

References

1944 births
Living people
20th-century evangelicals
21st-century evangelicals
American evangelicals
American people of English descent
Bradley University alumni
Fuller Theological Seminary alumni
Moody Bible Institute alumni
People from Eden Prairie, Minnesota
West Essex High School alumni